The following lists events that happened during 2013 in the Republic of Albania.

Incumbents
President: Bujar Nishani
Prime Minister: Sali Berisha (until 15 September), Edi Rama (starting 15 September)
Deputy Prime Minister: 
 until 4 April: Edmond Haxhinasto
 4 April-15 September: Myqerem Tafaj
 from 15 September: Niko Peleshi

Events

June
23 June - Parliamentary elections are held, resulting in a victory for the Socialist Party of Albania.

 30th Of June - Albanian Warning System Airs Test

September 
 15 September - Edi Rama is elected by Parliament as Prime Minister of Albania.

References

 
Years of the 21st century in Albania
2010s in Albania
Albania